Bloemendaal is a municipality and a town in the Netherlands, in the province of North Holland. Bloemendaal is, together with Wassenaar, the wealthiest place in the Netherlands.

In October 2015, after persistent problems with the local governance in Bloemendaal, the King's Commissioner of North Holland, Johan Remkes, threatened to disband the municipality if the problems were not resolved within a year. Bernt Schneiders, the mayor of Haarlem, was appointed as acting mayor of Bloemendaal.

Population centres 
The municipality of Bloemendaal consists of the following cities, towns, villages and/or districts:

Local government 
The municipal government of Bloemendaal consists of 19 seats, which as of 2018 are divided as follows:

 VVD - 5 seats
 CDA - 3 seats
 GroenLinks - 3 seat
 D66 - 3 seats
 Hart van Bloemendaal - 2 seats
 PvdA - 1 seat
 Liberaal Bloemendaal - 1 seats
 Vrijzinnig Democratisch Bloemendaal - 1 seat

Railway connections 
Bloemendaal has a railway station - Bloemendaal railway station. There are two other stations in the municipality of Bloemendaal - Overveen and Heemstede-Aerdenhout.

Sports 
Bloemendaal is home to one of the country's most famous field hockey clubs, HC Bloemendaal. The men's first team competes for the Dutch Hoofdklasse (top league) title nearly every year.

Thijsse's Hof 
In 1925 Thijsse's Hof (the Garden of Thijsse) was created. It was the first wildlife garden in the Netherlands. It was gifted to Jac. P. Thijsse at the occasion of his 60th birthday. The garden still exists today.

Notable people 
 Bertha Frensel Wegener (1874 in Bloemendaal – 1953) composer and music educator
 Frederick Koolhoven (1886 in Bloemendaal – 1946) aircraft designer in Britain and Netherlands
 Leo Brongersma (1907 in Bloemendaal – 1994) zoologist, herpetologist, author, and lecturer
 Johan Benders (1907 in Bloemendaal – 1943) teacher and victim of the Gestapo 
 Hendrik Van Riessen (1911 in Bloemendaal – 2000 in Bloemendaal) second generation reformational philosopher
 Frank de Miranda (1913 in Bloemendaal - 1986) sculptor, psychologist and publicist
 Tjitze Baarda (born 1932 in Vogelenzang) emeritus professor of theology and religious sciences 
 Erwin Nypels (born 1933 in Bloemendaal) former politician
 Louwrien Wijers (born 1941 in Aerdenhout) artist and writer
 Ankie Broekers-Knol (born 1946) politician, a municipal councillor
 Arielle Vernède (born 1953 in Bloemendaal) pianist.
 Frank Gerard Rozendaal (1957 in Bloemendaal–2013) ornithologist, researched the Southeast Asian avifauna

Sport 
 Cornelis van der Vliet (1880 in Bloemendaal – 1960 in Bloemendaal) sports shooter, competed in the team clay pigeon event at the 1920 Summer Olympics
 Kick Smit (1911 in Bloemendaal – 1974) football player, 29 caps and 26 goals for the Netherlands national football team
 Aat de Roos (1919 in Bloemendaal – 1992) field hockey player, competed in the 1936 Summer Olympics
 Gijs van Lennep (born 1942 in Aerdenhout) esquire and former racing driver 
 Robert van Werkhoven (born 1954 in Bloemendaal) sailor, competed at 1976 Summer Olympics
 Gert Jan Schlatmann (born 1963 in Bloemendaal) former field hockey player
 Ellen Hoog (born 1986 in Bloemendaal) field hockey player

Gallery

References

External links
Official website
Tourist Info about Bloemendaal

 
Municipalities of North Holland
Populated places in North Holland